The Town of Thursday Island was a local government area in Queensland, Australia, based on Thursday Island.

History
The town was proclaimed in October 1885.

Mayors
 1927: J. Ferguson

References

Former local government areas of Queensland
1885 establishments in Australia
Far North Queensland